Parliamentary elections were held in Bulgaria on 23 September 1894. Voter turnout was unusually high.

Results

References

Bulgaria
1894 in Bulgaria
Parliamentary elections in Bulgaria
September 1894 events